Dan Schneider is an American entrepreneur and current CEO of  SIB Development & Consulting, Inc. He is known for his entry into the business world at an early age, and for unconventional business strategies in areas such as marketing, office culture, and employee retention incentives.

Early life and business career

Schneider was born in 1981 in Doylestown, Pennsylvania.  He withdrew from high school at 16 years of age and never completed any level of education beyond ninth grade. He began working as an entertainer at T.G.I. Friday's restaurants, making balloon animals for customers and working for tips. During this time, he decided to quit working for the company that employed him and instead approach the restaurants to work directly for them. He did so, and began employing others to do the same.

After a brief stint working in business-to-business sales in the mobile phone industry, Schneider opened his own mobile phone store, Main Street Cellular, at age 18, and expanded to 12 retail locations over the next two years. He sold these stores individually and then established a new business wholesaling mobile phones. This company, Main Street Assets, generated approximately $35 million in revenue during its first two years.

After several years, Schneider grew tired of the long working hours his position required of him and frustrated with the feeling that he never had time to enjoy his youth. This led him to have what he described as an epiphany that he should withdraw from working life and take time off to pursue personal hobbies. Within a week of his decision, Schneider had sold both his company and his house. He began an extended personal sabbatical during which he traveled the world. He has said of this period, "For two and a half years, I took not working as seriously as I'd taken working." He became very physically active during this time, cycling long distances every day and taking up kiteboarding.

SIB development and consulting

Toward the end of his sabbatical, Schneider ended up visiting friends in Charleston, SC for an extended stay. Growing bored and wanting to resume his career in the business world, he rented some office space and began the daily routine of going into work, though still without a clear idea of what kind of work he would pursue.

Schneider eventually decided to go into contingency-based business consulting and founded SIB Development & Consulting. The firm reviews businesses' fixed monthly costs and reduces expenses by correcting billing errors and also negotiating more favorable vendor contracts based on benchmark pricing. Clients then pay SIB half the savings created by the review.

After starting two successful mobile phone companies, Schneider's choice to go into a different line of business with SIB was in part to test himself and prove he could be successful in a different field.

Management style

Prior to his sabbatical, Schneider described himself as "your stereotypical lunatic CEO" – hotheaded, demanding, and impatient. However, his personality has since mellowed, and Schneider has said that he tries to maintain an optimistic attitude and promote positive thinking in the workplace. When an employee makes a significant mistake, Schneider has a policy of making them buy ice cream for the rest of the office. By celebrating the occasion, enough attention is drawn to the offending employee to ensure a lesson is learned, but the end result is positive. Another rule is that no employee should tell him bad news after 3:00 PM, to reduce end-of-day stress.

Schneider often seeks employee feedback on process improvement and other new ideas, and encourages employees to write him from an anonymous e-mail address if they wish to bring sensitive matters to his attention but would rather not do so personally.

As the head of a cost reduction consulting firm, Schneider is frugal and creative about saving his own company money, and sometimes buys used office furniture for discounted prices from other companies that are going out of business or downsizing.

Retention bonus

Schneider's company, SIB Development & Consulting, attracted national media attention in 2011 for their policy of awarding retention bonuses in the form of $50,000 lump-sum payments to any employee who remains with the company for at least five years. The bonus is awarded regardless of job title or salary at the company, and is renewable for every five-year interval the employee remains employed by SIB.

Schneider enacted the retention bonus policy to incentivize and reward company loyalty, and to reduce the expenses and inefficiency associated with employee turnover or job-searching while on the clock. He also liked the idea of awarding a single, large lump sum payment to maximize the impact on SIB employees' lives.

Press and accolades

Schneider has been featured in a variety of programs on television, radio, and in print. He has been interviewed on CNN, Fox News, and NPR.  He was also featured in The New York Times ' "Corner Office" feature, and has served as a guest blogger for Forbes.com.  He was included in Business News Daily's "20 Entrepreneurs We Loved in 2011" and the Charleston Regional Business Journal's "40 Under 40" list in 2013.

References

American chief executives of financial services companies
1981 births
People from Doylestown, Pennsylvania
Living people